The second Morgan government (2003–2007) was a Labour majority government in Wales.

Having won 30 out of the 60 seats available in the 2003 general election and with the non-voting Presiding Officer and Deputy both coming from the opposition, the Labour party were able to form a majority government with 30 seats to the opposition's 28 with Rhodri Morgan continuing as First Minister.

This majority continued until Peter Law left Labour in 2005 to sit as an independent on the opposition benches, giving the government 29 and the opposition (excluding the Presiding Officer and Deputy) 29.

Two members of the National Assembly were elected to the UK Parliament at the 2005 UK general election (David Davies and Peter Law) reducing the collective strength of the opposition for day-to-day business. The final budget of this Assembly term passed following an agreement with Plaid during which their 11 voting members abstained.

Cabinet

Junior ministers

September 2005 Re-shuffle 

Following a mid-term re-shuffle in September 2005 Jane Hutt was removed from her post as Health and Social Care Minister after controversy over long waiting lists and criticism from AMs  to Minister for Assembly Business along with the additional responsibilities of Equalities & Children. Karen Sinclair remained as Chief Whip to the Labour party allowing her to stay in the cabinet as an observer.

Further changes were the promotion of Brian Gibbons from a junior minister to Minister for Health & Social Care, along with the promotion of Tamsin Dunwoody & Christine Chapman to Deputy Ministers and a few minor changes to existing members roles.

Cabinet

Junior ministers

See also 
List of Welsh Assembly Governments
2003 National Assembly for Wales election
Members of the 2nd National Assembly for Wales

References

Welsh governments
Ministries of Elizabeth II
2003 establishments in Wales
2007 disestablishments in Wales
Cabinets established in 2003
Cabinets disestablished in 2007